Planotortrix avicenniae is a species of moth of the family Tortricidae. It is endemic to New Zealand. It is found in the North Island and its larvae feed on mangrove trees.

Taxonomy and etymology

This species was first described in 1990 by John S. Dugdale. The holotype specimen in held at the New Zealand Arthropod Collection. The species name refers to Avicennia, the genus of the larval host plant.

Description
Adults are charcoal brown with an obscure pattern, sometimes consisting of ash or ochreous scales. The female of the species can be difficult to distinguish from the females of P. excessana and P. octo. However the larvae of P. avicenniae are distinctive. Unlike the green headed and bodied larvae of P. excessana and P. octo they are grey greenish in colour with a brownish head.

Distribution 
This species is endemic to New Zealand. It has only been observed in the North Island in Northland, Auckland, Waikato, Coromandel, and the Bay of Plenty.

Biology and behaviour 
The larvae of this species web together and feed on the leaves of their host plant.

Habitat and host species
The larvae feed only on the mangrove tree species Avicennia marina.

References

Moths described in 1990
Archipini
Moths of New Zealand
Endemic fauna of New Zealand
Endemic moths of New Zealand